Aakasame Haddu is a 2011 Indian Telugu-language romantic drama film Ravi Charan and starring Navdeep, Rajeev Saluri and Panchi Bora.

Cast 
Navdeep as Karthik
Rajeev Saluri as Narayana
Panchi Bora as Krithi
Venkatesh Maha as Karthik's friend

Production 
₹1.72 crore of Enforcement Directorate's loan funds were used to make this film. The film caused a loss of ₹54.64 crore.

Reception 
A critic from The Hindu wrote that "Not a bad watch at all and if you want to know why the film has been titled Aakasame Haddu (The sky's the limit), it is imperative that you wait till the film finishes". A critic from Filmibeat wrote that "No doubt, the film is worth watching". A critic from Full Hyderabad wrote that "In all, a film you can ignore, unless you're stuck with a really option-less afternoon on television". A critic from Nowrunning wrote that "In a nutshell, Aakasame Haddu, as the title suggests had sky as limit but fails miserably to even go beyond average".

References